Kayford is an unincorporated community in Kanawha County, West Virginia, United States.

Doris Fields, Blues singer who performs as Lady D, grew up in Kayford.

See also
Slab Fork, West Virginia

References

Town population: 0

Unincorporated communities in Kanawha County, West Virginia
Unincorporated communities in West Virginia
Coal towns in West Virginia